An  or simply  or  is a wooden wand traditionally used in Shinto purification rituals.

The word Taima also refers to cannabis in the Japanese language Nusa is an old word for cannabis

The  is a type of ōnusa. although they are often used in different ways than normal Onusa, usually kept in envelopes

The most common type of Nusa today consists of a sakaki branch or a white wooden stick with a shide or Nusa ramie attached to the end. . In Board of Ceremonies' "Jinja Matsuri Shiki" (1875), a branch of sakaki is used for the Nusa, and in Yatsuka Seinan's "Jinja Yushoku Kijitsu" (1951), Nusa is described as a sakaki branch with only ramie or, in addition, shidare attached, while konusa is made of wooden sticks, thin wood or bamboo. At Ise Jingu Shrine, mikisakaki, a sakaki branch with its leaves and branches still attached, is also used with Nusa attached to it, and a sakaki branch is attached to a cord of hemp as a yu (cotton) . In some cases, such as at Kamogoso Shrine (Shimogamo Shrine), a branch of a peach tree is used, following the myth in the Kojiki .

Nusa is also used in different ways. In the present day, it is shaken noisily as if to purify dust, but in ancient ceremonies such as at Kasuga Taisha, it is stroked. The same is true at Ise Shrine, where noisy purification is forbidden . Today, Nusa is used by waving it left, right, and left toward the person or object to be purified, which is believed to transfer impurities to the Nusa. In the past, it was left, right, and center.

Gallery

See also
 Aspergillum
 Flail
 Crook and flail
 Glossary of Shinto
 
 
 
 Inau – Ainu version of the ōnusa
 Jingu Taima
 
 Ruyi (scepter)
 
 Tamagushi

References

Bibliography

External links 

 『大麻（神道）』 - コトバンク
 『大麻（民俗）』 - コトバンク
 『大幣・大麻』 - コトバンク
 『大麻』 - コトバンク

Ceremonial weapons
Exorcism in Shinto
Honorary weapons
Ritual weapons
Shinto religious objects
Shinto in Japan
Wands